The Street Singer is a 1912 American short silent drama film. The film starred Earle Foxe and Alice Joyce.  It was Foxe's first film, aged seventeen.

The film was made into a successful musical in 1924 with a libretto by Frederick Lonsdale and music by Harold Fraser-Simson, starring Phyllis Dare.  It played at the Lyric Theatre for 360 performances and enjoyed successful tours.

Cast
Alice Joyce as Pepita
Earle Foxe as Karl
Mayme Kelso as Mrs. Burleigh
Adelaide Lawrence

External links

1912 films
American silent short films
1912 drama films
American black-and-white films
Kalem Company films
1912 short films
Silent American drama films
1910s American films